Aperture Foundation is a nonprofit arts institution, founded in 1952 by Ansel Adams, Minor White, Barbara Morgan, Dorothea Lange, Nancy Newhall, Beaumont Newhall, Ernest Louie, Melton Ferris, and Dody Warren. Their vision was to create a forum for fine art photography, a new concept at the time. The first issue of the magazine Aperture was published in spring 1952 in San Francisco.

In January 2011, Chris Boot joined the organization as its director. Boot has previously been an independent photobook publisher and worked with Magnum Photos and Phaidon Press. Sarah Meister, curator of photography at the Museum of Modern Art from 2009 to 2020, was named as Boot's replacement in the Executive Director position in January 2021, starting in May 2021.

Books 
Aperture Foundation is a publisher of photography books, with more than 600 titles in print. Its book publication program began in 1965, with Edward Weston: The Flame of Recognition, which became one of its best-selling titles. Some, like Diane Arbus: An Aperture Monograph, have been in print for 40 years. Aperture supports the efforts of other non-profit organizations by partnering on books, exhibitions, and educational programming.

Publications 
 The Golden Age of British Photography, 1839–1900. New York: Aperture Foundation, 1984. .
Masters of Photography: Collector's Set. New York: Aperture Foundation, 1997. .
Crossing Borders: Contemporary Czech and Slovak Photography. New York: Aperture Foundation, 1998. .
Istanbul: City of a Hundred Names, with Orhan Pamuk New York: Aperture, 2007. 
Alex Webb and Rebecca Norris Webb on Street Photography and the Poetic Image: The Photography Workshop Series. New York, Aperture Foundation, 2014. . Photographs and text by Alex Webb and Rebecca Norris Webb, introduction by Teju Cole.
Larry Fink on Composition and Improvisation: The Photography Workshop Series. New York: Aperture Foundation, 2014. . Photographs and text by Larry Fink, introduction by Lisa Kereszi.
Other Rooms. New York: Aperture Foundation, 2014. . Photographs by Jo Ann Callis. 
The Bikeriders. New York: Aperture Foundation, 2014. . Photographs by Danny Lyon. 
¡Vámonos! Bernard Plossu in México: 1965-66, 1970, 1974, 1981. New York: Aperture Foundation, 2014. . Photographs by Bernard Plossu, edited by Salvador Albiñana and Juan García de Oteyza.
The New Black Vanguard 2019 by Antwaun Sargent

Aperture/Michael E. Hoffman Award 
In 2003, the Foundation instituted the first Aperture/Michael E. Hoffman Award, in memory of Michael E. Hoffman (died 2001), who was Aperture's publisher for 37 years.

The Paris Photo–Aperture Foundation PhotoBook Awards

The Paris Photo–Aperture Foundation PhotoBook Awards is a yearly photography book award that is given jointly by Paris Photo and Aperture Foundation. It is announced at the Paris Photo fair and was established in 2012. The categories are Photography Catalogue of the Year, PhotoBook of the Year and First PhotoBook (with a $10,000 prize).

Aperture Portfolio Prize
The Aperture Portfolio Prize is an annual international competition to discover, exhibit, and publish new talents in photography.

Winners:
 2006: Hiroshi Watanabe
 2007: Julio Bittencourt
 2008: Michael Corridore
 2009: Alexander Gronsky
 2010: David Favrod
 2011: Sarah Palmer
 2013: Bryan Schutmaat
 2014: Amy Elkins
 2015: Drew Nikonowicz
 2016: Eli Durst
 2017: Natalie Krick
 2018: Ka-Man Tse
 2019: Mark McKnight
 2020: Dannielle Bowman
 2021: Donavon Smallwood
 2022: Felipe Romero Beltrán

Exhibitions 

In 2005, Aperture’s three-thousand-square-foot gallery opened in New York’s Chelsea art district. Many of the shows travel to venues in the U.S. and abroad. Aperture's Chelsea gallery showcases exhibitions organized by sister institutions.

Aperture has exhibited shows including Nazar: Photographs from the Arab World; Joan Fontcuberta: Landscapes Without Memory; William Christenberry, Photographs: 1961–2005; A Couple of Ways of Doing Something, images by Chuck Close, poems by Bob Holman; Lisette Model and Her Successors; and the Lucie-nominated Invasion 68: Prague, photographs by Josef Koudelka.

References

External links

American photography organizations
Photography foundations
Visual arts publishing companies
Publishing companies established in 1952
Awards established in 2012
Photography awards
Arts foundations based in the United States